Montelíbano is a town and municipality located in the Córdoba Department of Colombia.  It is the seat of the Roman Catholic Diocese of Montelíbano.

Montelíbano is host of one of the largest ferronickel mines, the Cerro Matoso mine.  The Company Cerro Matoso S.A. operates the mine site, as well as the associated smelter.

References

 Gobernacion de Cordoba - Montelíbano
 Montelíbano official website

Municipalities of Córdoba Department